is a prefectural museum in Saitama, Japan, dedicated to the history and folklore of Saitama Prefecture. The museum opened in 1971.

See also
 Chichibu Province
 Musashi Province
 List of Historic Sites of Japan (Saitama)
 List of National Treasures of Japan (crafts: swords)

References

External links
  Saitama Prefectural Museum of History and Folklore
 Saitama Prefectural Museum of History and Folklore at Google Cultural Institute

Museums in Saitama Prefecture
Buildings and structures in Saitama (city)
History museums in Japan
Prefectural museums
Museums established in 1971
1971 establishments in Japan